Erlea is female given name. It means "a bee" in Basque language.

Name Days 
Czech: 10 March or 21 September

External links 
Behind the Name

Feminine given names
Basque feminine given names
Bees in popular culture